Desert Lake may refer to:

 Dry lake
 Desert Lake, California
 Desert Lake, Utah
 Desert Lake, Argentina